SS Thomas Ruffin was a Liberty ship built in the United States during World War II. She was named after Thomas Ruffin, an American jurist and Justice of the North Carolina Supreme Court from 1829 to 1852 and again from 1858 to 1859. He was Chief Justice of that Court from 1833 to 1852.

Construction
Thomas Ruffin was laid down on 9 March 1942, under a Maritime Commission (MARCOM) contract, MCE hull 39, by the Bethlehem-Fairfield Shipyard, Baltimore, Maryland; she was sponsored by Mrs. Joseph F. Johnson, the wife of the MARCOM senior hull inspector at the Bethlehem-Fairfield Shipyard, and was launched on 18 May 1942.

History
She was allocated to A.H. Bull & Co., Inc., on 6 June 1942.

Attack
Thomas Ruffin left Bahia, Brazil, on 28 February 1943, loaded only with water ballast, as part of Convoy BT-6, for Trinidad. Thomas Ruffin was struck in the engine room by one torpedo on her port side. In the explosion the shaft and engine were destroyed and three crewmen killed. The explosion also ruptured steam lines and the fuel tanks along with disabling the radio and causing the ship to take on a list to starboard. The crew of eight officers, 35 crewmen, and 15 Armed guard were able to abandon the ship in two lifeboats and two rafts. The commander of the Armed guard, with one crewman, remained behind and were rejoined by the captain and one crewman at daylight.  picked up 40 of the survivors.

Disposition
 took Thomas Ruffin in tow, arriving at the naval dock in Port of Spain, on 17 March, where repairs were made so she could be towed to Mobile, Alabama.  She was declared a Constructive Total Loss and laid up to be used as a training ship 2 September 1943.

On 31 August 1945, she was laid up in the National Defense Reserve Fleet, in Mobile. She was sold for scrapping on 25 March 1947, to Pinto Island Metals Co., for $18,200. She was withdrawn from the fleet on 18 April 1947.

References

Bibliography

 
 
 
 
 

 

Liberty ships
Ships built in Baltimore
1942 ships
Maritime incidents in March 1943
Mobile Reserve Fleet